Choreutis streptatma is a moth in the family Choreutidae. It was described by Edward Meyrick in 1938. It is found on New Guinea and on Buru.

References

Choreutis
Moths described in 1938